Corina Morariu and Kimberly Po were the reigning champions but did not compete that year.

Amanda Coetzer and Lori McNeil won in the final 6–3, 2–6, 6–0 against Janet Lee and Wynne Prakusya.

Seeds
Champion seeds are indicated in bold text while text in italics indicates the round in which those seeds were eliminated.

 Lisa Raymond /  Rennae Stubbs (semifinals)
 Cara Black /  Nicole Pratt (semifinals)
 Ai Sugiyama /  Yuka Yoshida (first round)
 Amanda Coetzer /  Lori McNeil (champions)

Draw

References
 2001 IGA U.S. Indoor Championships Doubles Draw

U.S. National Indoor Championships
2001 WTA Tour
IGA US indoor
2001 in American tennis